The Namibian Practical Shooting Association (NPSA) is the Namibian association for practical shooting under the International Practical Shooting Confederation.

External links 
 Official homepage of The Namibian Practical Shooting Association

References 

Regions of the International Practical Shooting Confederation
Sports governing bodies of Namibia
Sports organizations established in 1978